Trai Byers (born July 19, 1983) is an American actor. He is best known for playing Andre Lyon in the Fox television series Empire (2015–2020).

Early life
Trai Byers was born in Kansas City, Kansas.  After a year of high school in Kansas City, he completed his high-school education in Georgia. Byers then graduated from Andrew College with an associate degree in Theater and graduated from the University of Kansas with a bachelor's degree in communications. He also attended the American Musical and Dramatic Academy in Los Angeles, and the Yale School of Drama.

Career
In 2011, Byers made his television debut with a recurring role on the ABC daytime soap opera, All My Children, and the following year had a role in The CW teen soap, 90210. He played civil rights activist James Forman in the 2014 historical epic film, Selma directed by Ava DuVernay. He plays Andre Lyon in Fox's 2015 music-industry primetime soap opera, Empire.

Personal life
During the October 7, 2015 episode of the daytime talk show, FABLife, Byers's costar Grace Gealey confirmed that they were engaged. He and Gealey married on Grand Cayman Island on April 14, 2016.

Filmography

Film

Television

Awards and nominations

References

External links 

2015 Trai Byers interview with Jon Niccum

Living people
African-American male actors
American male soap opera actors
American male film actors
American male television actors
21st-century American male actors
Yale School of Drama alumni
1983 births
21st-century African-American people
20th-century African-American people